Nizhnyaya Manyava (Tübänge Mänäw) is a rural locality (a khutor) in Inzersky Selsoviet, Beloretsky District, Bashkortostan, Russia. The population was 6 as of 2010. There is 1 street.

Geography 
Nizhnyaya Manyava is located 61 km northwest of Beloretsk (the district's administrative centre) by road. Verkhnyaya Manyava is the nearest rural locality.

References 

Rural localities in Beloretsky District